Soyopa (Yaqui: "hot land") is a town in Soyopa Municipality, in the eastern region of the Mexican state of Sonora.  The elevation is 350 meters.  

The main economic activities are cattle raising (16,000 head in 2000), agriculture (rye, sorghum, wheat), and mining.

Silver was mined here beginning in the eighteenth century and the town had its economic heyday around 1880.  After that the silver mines ran out and the population declined.

External links
Soyopa, Ayuntamiento Digital (Official Website of Soyopa, Sonora)
The Road to Soyopa a book about exploring the back roads of Sonora

Populated places in Sonora